Recep Gül (born 5 November 2000) is a Turkish footballer who currently plays as a forward for 1928 Bucaspor at TFF Second League.

Career statistics

Club

Notes

References

External links
 

2000 births
Living people
Turkish footballers
Turkey youth international footballers
Turkish expatriate footballers
Association football forwards
Galatasaray S.K. footballers
K.V.C. Westerlo players
Challenger Pro League players
Turkish expatriate sportspeople in Belgium
Expatriate footballers in Belgium